Stergomena Lawrence Tax (born 6 July 1960) is Tanzania's minister for foreign affairs and East African cooperation since 2022. She was previously Minister of Defence and National Service from 2021 to 2022, becoming the first woman to hold the title since the country’s independence. Before that she served as the executive secretary of the Southern African Development Community (SADC).

Early life
Tax was educated at a number of primary schools in Tanzania and at Lake Secondary School in Mwanza where she was a contemporary of Tanzanian fifth president John Magufuli.

She obtained her Bachelor of Commerce degree in Finance from the University of Dar es Salaam in 1991. She thereafter obtained a Master of Philosophy in Policy Management and Development Economics and a Doctor of Philosophy in International Development from the University of Tsukuba in Japan.

Career
She served as the Permanent Secretary at the Ministry of East African Cooperation from 2008 to 2013 when she was appointed as the Executive Secretary of the Southern African Development Community at the 33rd Summit of the Heads of State and Government in Lilongwe, Malawi.

In August 2021 she was replaced by Elias Mpedi Magosi as secretary of SADC. On  10 September 2021 she was nominated Member of Parliament by President Samia Suluhu Hassan. On 12 September 2021, she was appointed minister of defence. On 3 October 2022, she was appointed minister of foreign affairs.

References

External links
 Profile: Stergomena Tax at SADC

1960 births
Living people
Defense ministers of Tanzania
Female defence ministers
Female foreign ministers
Foreign ministers of Tanzania
Lake Secondary School alumni
People from Mwanza Region
Southern African Development Community people
University of Dar es Salaam alumni
University of Tsukuba alumni